Strymon rufofusca, known generally as the red-crescent scrub-hairstreak or red-crescent hairstreak, is a species of hairstreak in the butterfly family Lycaenidae.

The MONA or Hodges number for Strymon rufofusca is 4338.

References

Further reading

External links

 

Eumaeini
Articles created by Qbugbot
Butterflies described in 1877